The Adventures of John and Tony was a radio programme that aired in September 1999 on BBC Radio 4.  There was one series of four thirty-minute episodes made.  It starred John Hegley and Simon Munnery.

References 
 Lavalie, John. The Adventures of John and Tony. EpGuides. 14 May 2005. 29 Jul 2007

BBC Radio 4 programmes